Diamantendetektiv Dick Donald is a German television series.

See also
List of German television series

External links
 

German action television series
German crime television series
1971 German television series debuts
1971 German television series endings
Television shows set in South Africa
German-language television shows
ZDF original programming